30 Aniversario (trigésimo aniversario) is a 1987 studio album by Tommy Olivencia and his band. As the title implies, the album was made to commemorate the 30th anniversary of Tommy Olivencia as a bandleader.

Singles
Three singles were produced from the album, two of which charted on Billboard Hot Latin Tracks. The lead singer for the first-two songs was Hector Tricoche while Paquito Acosta provided the lead vocals for the third single.

"Lobo Domesticado" (Domestic Wolf) was the first single released on the album which reached the top ton on Hot Latin Tracks peaking on #6. The song is a cover of Mexican singer-songwriter of Joan Sebastian who released the single the same year which peaked #37 on Hot Latin Tracks.
"No Me Tires La Primera Piedra" (Don't Cast The First Stone) was the second single released from the album and peaked on #13 on Hot Latin Tracks.
"Lapiz de Carmin" (Carmine Lipstick) was the third single released from the album.

Track listing

Personnel 

Paquito Acosta – vocals
Hector Tricoche – vocals

Chart position

Reception

José A. Estévez Jr. of Allmusic gave the album a positive review praising the vocalists, production, and the expression of romanticism.

See also
List of number-one Billboard Tropical Albums from the 1980s

References

1987 albums
Tommy Olivencia albums